Masada: Alef, also known as א or Masada 1, is a 1994 album by American jazz composer and saxophonist John Zorn featuring the Masada Quartet performing compositions inspired by Zorn's examination of Jewish culture.  It was the first album in a project that has included ten studio albums, concerts, and live recordings.

The album takes its inspiration from the mass suicide of Zealots at Masada in 73 CE, and is  dedicated to Asher Ginzberg (1856–1927), the founding father of Cultural Zionism.

Reception

The AllMusic review by Don Snowden awarded the album four stars stating "Alef is full of thrilling, varied music and just may remind some people who are put off by John Zorn's constant stream of conceptual projects how good a musician he is in a straight-ahead jazz context".

Track listing
"Jair" – 4:53
"Bith Aneth" – 6:24
"Tzofeh" – 5:13
"Ashnah" – 6:20
"Tahah" – 5:40
"Kanah" – 7:26
"Delin" – 1:54
"Janohah" – 9:40
"Zebdi" – 2:45
"Idalah-Abal" – 6:15
"Zelah" – 3:48
All compositions by John Zorn
Recorded at RPM in New York City on February 20, 1994

Personnel
Masada
John Zorn — alto saxophone
Dave Douglas — trumpet
Greg Cohen — bass
Joey Baron — drums

References

1994 albums
Masada (band) albums
albums produced by John Zorn
DIW Records albums